Mimene kolbei  is a butterfly of the family Hesperiidae. It is endemic to New Guinea.
The name honours Hermann Julius Kolbe.

References

Hesperiinae
Butterflies described in 1899
Endemic fauna of New Guinea